Membrilla is a municipality in the province of Ciudad Real, Castile-La Mancha, Spain. It has a population of 6,601.

References

External links
 Official website of the Ayuntamiento de Membrilla

Sources
 Rubio Martínez, Carlos Javier (2017): El Campo de Montiel en la Edad Media. Ciudad Real: Biblioteca de Autores Manchegos

Municipalities in the Province of Ciudad Real